The 1963 World Fencing Championships were held in Gdańsk, Poland.

Medal table

Medal summary

Men's events

Women's events

References

FIE Results

World Fencing Championships
Fencing Championships
F
Sports competitions in Gdańsk
1963 in fencing
20th century in Gdańsk